The 2013 A-League Grand Final was the eighth A-League Grand Final, which took place at the Sydney Football Stadium on 21 April 2013. The match was won by Central Coast Mariners, who beat Western Sydney Wanderers 2–0, in front of 42,102 people. This was the first time the Central Coast Mariners became champions of Australia, after losing three previous grand finals.

Route to the final

Both teams came into the final in good form, the Wanderers undefeated in 13 games and the Mariners having won their past 4 A-League games in a row. The sides had previously met three times over the course of the season, with each team winning one match as well as one draw.

In their inaugural season, Wanderers performed strongly. Mixed early results were followed by a streak of 12 undefeated games, including a run of 10 wins in a row, which saw the side top the regular season table, winning the A-League premiership. In the semi-final, the Wanderers beat Brisbane Roar 2–0, scoring a goal in each half to qualify for the grand final.

Entering the season as reigning A-League premiers, the Mariners had a strong season, highlighted by the fact that they lost only one match at their home ground, Bluetongue Stadium- against the Wanderers. After finishing second in the regular season, the Mariners played Melbourne Victory in the semi-final, winning 1-0 through a Daniel McBreen goal and so qualifying for the final.

The top six teams from the 2012–13 season qualified for the finals series, with the top two receiving byes into the semi-finals.

Match

Summary
It was announced by the FFA, following Western Sydney Wanderers earning the right to host the grand final, that the match would be played at the Sydney Football Stadium due to its greater capacity than the Wanderers usual home ground, Parramatta Stadium. The match was played in front of a sold-out crowd of 42,102 at the Sydney Football Stadium- the largest crowd of the 2012–13 A-League. In Australia, it was shown live on Fox Sports.

The first clear-cut chance of the match came when Trent Sainsbury played a ball over the top for Mile Sterjovski. Sterjovski got in behind the defence and chipped over Wanderers' 'keeper Ante Covic, only for his shot to hit the crossbar and bounce out for a goal kick. Shortly before half-time, the Mariners took the lead. Michael McGlinchey's corner found Patrick Zwaanswijk at the near post, whose powerful header put the Mariners ahead going into half-time.

Soon after play resumed, both Shinji Ono and Sterjovski had attempts on goal from attacking positions for their respective sides, but neither was able to put their shot on target. Midway through the half, the Mariners were awarded a penalty. It came after Daniel McBreen retrieved a ball deep inside the penalty area and cut back the bouncing ball, only for it to hit the arm of Jérome Polenz, leading Peter Green to award a penalty. From the resultant penalty, McBreen sent Covic the wrong way, powering his shot into the top left corner and giving the Mariners a two-goal advantage which they retained until the final whistle.

Daniel McBreen was awarded the Joe Marston Medal as man of the match. The win marked the Central Coast Mariners' first A-League Championship.

Details

Statistics

See also
 2012–13 A-League
 List of A-League champions

References

External links
 Official A-League Website

2012–13 A-League season
A-League Men Grand Finals
Central Coast Mariners FC matches
Western Sydney Wanderers FC matches
Soccer in Sydney